A parsec is a unit of distance.

Parsec may also refer to:

Computing
 PARSEC, a software package designed to perform electronic structure calculations of solids and molecules 
 Parsec (parser), a  Parser combinator library  for Haskell
 Parsec (software), a desktop capturing application
 Princeton Application Repository for Shared-Memory Computers
 Convex Computer, originally named Parsec
 A parallel simulation language used in GloMoSim
 A rack extension from Propellerhead Software

Other uses
 Parsec (magazine), an Argentine sci-fi magazine
 Parsec (video game), a 1982 video game for the TI-99/4A
 Parsec Awards, a set of awards for science fiction podcasts
 "Parsec", a song by Stereolab from Dots and Loops
 Parsecs, some levels in the video game Gaplus

See also
 PARSEC47, a scrolling shooter video game